The New Zealand men's national basketball team is the senior men's national basketball team of New Zealand. The team is nicknamed the Tall Blacks. The Tall Blacks name is one of many New Zealand national team nicknames related to the All Blacks. Over its history, the team has won three FIBA Oceania Championships, and twice appeared in the Summer Olympic Games. It participated in its first FIBA Asia Cup in 2017, finishing in fourth place.

Haka 
The Tall Blacks perform a traditional Haka (Māori challenge) before every game, but due to the influence of Pāora Winitana and Paul Henare, it is very different from the ones performed by the All Blacks.

History
There is a long and storied history of basketball in New Zealand. The Tall Blacks competed at the 2000 Sydney Olympics, and finished with a 1–5 record, their only win coming against Angola, in the playoff for eleventh place.

In 2001, they defeated Australia, in a three-game series to qualify for the 2002 FIBA World Championship in Indianapolis, United States. At the tournament, they finished fourth, after beating Puerto Rico in the quarter-finals, before losses to Serbia and Montenegro and Germany. Tall Blacks captain Pero Cameron was the only non-NBA player named to the All-Tournament team in Indianapolis.

The Tall Blacks also qualified for the 2004 Athens Olympics, but again finished with a 1–5 record, and lost to Australia in the playoff for ninth place. Their most noted moment was on the 7th day of the games, when they defeated the then reigning 2002 FIBA World Championship gold medalists, Serbia and Montenegro, by a score of 90–87.

2006 FIBA World Championship
At the 2006 FIBA World Championship, the Tall Blacks were not to repeat their fourth-place finish from 2002. After an 0–3 start, the Tall Blacks rallied into the second round, with two straight wins to close out the group stage. However, they would fall in the round of 16 to the defending Olympic gold medalists Argentina, 79–62. After that disappointment, Tab Baldwin resigned as the head coach of the Tall Blacks, and was replaced by Nenad Vučinić, his longtime assistant coach.

2011 Stanković Cup
The squad competed at the 2011 Boris Stanković Cup in China. They played 3 games against difficult opposition, China, Russia, and Angola. After going down to Russia in the first game by just 3 points, the Tall Blacks quickly put that behind them, to smash China in their second game, which led to a good win against a strong Angolan team. The Tall Blacks came up against a strong Russian team in the final, but the Russians were no match for Tall Blacks star shooting guard Kirk Penney, as he scored 30 points, to give the Tall Blacks the win and the gold medal for 2011.

2023 World Cup Qualification 
Basketball New Zealand and world governing body FIBA announced the Tall Blacks will play a game against the Philippines in Auckland on July 3rd as part of the third window of the World Cup qualifying series. This is the first time the Tall Blacks have played on home court since beating Syria 97-74 in Wellington in 2018.

Performance table

Summer Olympic Games
 2000 Summer Olympic Games: 11th
 2004 Summer Olympic Games: 10th

FIBA Basketball World Cup
 1986 FIBA World Championship: 21st
 2002 FIBA World Championship: 4th
 2006 FIBA World Championship: 16th
 2010 FIBA World Championship: 12th
 2014 FIBA Basketball World Cup: 15th
 2019 FIBA Basketball World Cup: 19th
 2023 FIBA Basketball World Cup: Qualified

FIBA Asia Cup

FIBA Oceania Championship

Commonwealth Games
 2006 Commonwealth Games: Runners-up
 2018 Commonwealth Games: Third Place

FIBA Stanković Cup
 2007 Stanković Cup: Fifth Place
 2011 Stanković Cup: Champions
 2015 Stanković Cup: Champions

William Jones Cup
 2000 William Jones Cup: Champions

AusTiger International Basketball Tournament
 2019 AusTiger International Basketball Tournament: Third Place

Team

Current roster

Roster for the 2019 FIBA Basketball World Cup.

Depth chart

Notable players

Probably the most well-known former New Zealand Tall Black player in the National Basketball Association (NBA) is former San Antonio Spurs forward Sean Marks. Another New Zealand player, former University of Wisconsin star Kirk Penney, briefly played in the NBA, and later played in the EuroLeague with Maccabi Tel Aviv and Žalgiris, after being released by the New Zealand Breakers. In past generations, players such as Stan Hill and Glen Denham, were well revered and respected players, who were the face of New Zealand basketball.

 Ed Book – National Basketball League and Tall Blacks legend
 Pero Cameron – 2002 FIBA World Championship All-Tournament Team, two-time assistant coach (reappointed for his second stint in 2015, served as assistant to predecessor, Nenad Vucinic), named Head Coach in December 2019
 Glen Denham – Tall Blacks legend
 Mark Dickel – Tall Blacks star
 Paul Henare – Former New Zealand Breakers captain, head coach from 2015 to 2019
 Dillon Boucher – Former New Zealand Breakers player, General Manager of the New Zealand Breakers, Member of the New Zealand Order of Merit
 Stan Hill – Tall Blacks legend
 Phill Jones – Former Cairns Taipans captain
 Sean Marks – Former National Basketball Association player
 Kirk Penney – Former National Basketball Association player
 Frank Mulvihill – Tall Blacks legend
 Paora Winitana – Tall Blacks star, changed the Haka in 2006, only player to not play on Sundays due to religious reasons [Other than (at least) Byron Vaetoe and Tony Smith]

Past rosters
1986 World Championship: finished 21st among 24 teams

Gilbert Gordon, Peter Pokai, Stan Hill, Neil Stephens, Dave Edmonds, Ian Webb, Dave Mason, Tony Smith, Colin Crampton, Frank Mulvihill, Glen Denham, John Rademakers (Head Coach: Robert Bishop)

2000 Olympic Games: finished 11th among 12 teams

Sean Marks, Pero Cameron, Mark Dickel, Phill Jones, Kirk Penney, Robert Hickey, Nenad Vučinić, Tony Rampton, Paul Henare, Brad Riley, Ralph Lattimore, Peter Pokai (Head Coach: Keith Mair)

2002 World Championship: finished 4th among 16 teams

Sean Marks, Pero Cameron, Mark Dickel, Phill Jones, Kirk Penney, Robert Hickey, Dillon Boucher, Damon Rampton, Ed Book, Paul Henare, Paora Winitana, Judd Flavell (Head Coach: Tab Baldwin)

2004 Olympic Games: finished 10th among 12 teams

Sean Marks, Mark Dickel, Phill Jones, Pero Cameron, Kirk Penney, Dillon Boucher, Ed Book, Paul Henare, Paora Winitana, Tony Rampton, Aaron Olson, Craig Bradshaw (Head Coach: Tab Baldwin)

2006 World Championship: finished 16th among 24 teams

Kirk Penney, Pero Cameron, Phill Jones, Mark Dickel, Casey Frank, Paul Henare, Dillon Boucher, Paora Winitana, Tony Rampton, Craig Bradshaw, Aaron Olson, Mika Vukona (Head Coach: Tab Baldwin)

2010 World Championship: finished 12th among 24 teams

Thomas Abercrombie, Benny Anthony, Craig Bradshaw, Pero Cameron, Michael Fitchett, Casey Frank, Phill Jones, Jeremy Kench, Kirk Penney, Alex Pledger, Lindsay Tait, Mika Vukona (Head Coach: Nenad Vučinić)

Tall Blacks squad 2022
 Quintin Bailey, Jayden Bezzant, Taylor Britt, Joe Cook-Green, Max Darling, Taki Fahrensohn, Benjamin Gold, Hyrum Harris, Jordan Hunt, Brayden Inger, Jonathan Janssen, Michael Karena, Dom Kelman-Poto, Rob Loe, Dion Prewster, Elijah Puna, Richie Rodger, Ethan Rusbatch, Taane Samuel, Tom Vodanovich, Tai Wynyard

Kit

Manufacturer
2015: Peak

References

External links

 Basketball New Zealand official website
 FIBA profile

 
Men's national basketball teams